Forestiera is a genus of flowering plants in the olive family, Oleaceae. Members of the genus are often called swampprivets. Most are shrubs.

There are about 20 species, native to Mexico, Central America, the West Indies, Ecuador and the southern half of the United States. Phylogenetics indicate that Forestiera is sister to Hesperelaea, an extinct North American lineage.

Species include:

 Forestiera acuminata (Michx.) Poir. – eastern swampprivet - central and southeastern United States
 Forestiera angustifolia Torr. – narrowleaf forestiera, Texas forestiera, Texas swampprivet - Texas, northeastern Mexico
 Forestiera cartaginensis  Donn. Central America, southern Mexico
 Forestiera corollata  Cornejo & Wallander Guatemala
 Forestiera durangensis Standl. - Durango
 Forestiera ecuadorensis Cornejo & Bonifaz - Ecuador
 Forestiera eggersiana Krug & Urban – inkbush - Puerto Rico, Leeward Islands
 Forestiera godfreyi L.C. Anders. – Godfrey's swampprivet - Florida, Georgia, South Carolina
 Forestiera isabelae Hammel & Cornejo - Costa Rica
 Forestiera ligustrina (Michx.) Poir. – upland swamp-privet - Texas, southeastern United States
 Forestiera macrocarpa Brandegee - Baja California Sur
 Forestiera phillyreoides (Benth.) Torr. in W.H.Emory - central and southern Mexico
 Forestiera pubescens Nutt. – downy forestiera, stretchberry - southwestern United States, northern Mexico
 Forestiera racemosa S.Watson - Nuevo León
 Forestiera reticulata Torr. – netleaf swampprivet - western Texas
 Forestiera rhamnifolia Griseb. – caca ravet - Central America, West Indies, southern Mexico, Isla Socorro
 Forestiera segregata Krug & Urban – Florida swampprivet - Florida, Georgia, South Carolina, much of West Indies including Puerto Rico, Bahamas, Cayman Islands
 Forestiera selleana Urb. & Ekman - Hispaniola
 Forestiera shrevei Standl. – desert olive - Arizona
 Forestiera tomentosa S.Watson - central and southern Mexico

References

External links

 
Oleaceae genera
Taxonomy articles created by Polbot